Jimtown is the name of several communities in the U.S. state of West Virginia.

Jimtown, Harrison County, West Virginia
Jimtown, Morgan County, West Virginia
Jimtown, Randolph County, West Virginia